Shaphat was a Jewish Exilarch of the 2nd century AD succeeding his father Johanan. Little is known about him or the office of the exilarch at this time. His name is found in most surviving genealogical lines of Davidic descent. He was the father of his successor Huna Kamma, who is the first exilarch whose authority was recognized outside of the realm of Babylonia.

Related Articles
Exilarch
Seder Olam Zutta
List of Babylonian Exilarchs

External Links
Jewish Encyclopedia- Exilarch
 Genealogy of the House of David- Shaphat, 4th Exilarch

References

Exilarchs
2nd-century Jews
Jewish royalty